BH3 could refer to

The molecule borane, which has a chemical formula of BH3.
The  Bcl-2 homology domain 3.
BH3, the Chinese abbreviation for Honkai Impact 3rd